Jacob J. Seal (died October 4, 1873) was a state senator in Mississippi. He represented Hancock County from 1870 to 1873. Seal was killed by G. W. Maynard on October 4, 1873, in Bay St. Louis, Mississippi. The coroner's jury's verdict was that it was a willful murder. 

He was preceded by Roderick Seal and succeeded by J. P. Carter.

References

Year of birth missing
1873 deaths
Mississippi state senators
People from Hancock County, Mississippi
19th-century American politicians

American murder victims